London School of Commerce, fully accredited by Accreditation Service for International Colleges (ASIC) a member of Education UK. LSC was amongst first hundred colleges in the UK to be granted the Highly Trusted Sponsor status for Tier 4 student visa by the UK Border Agency . Founded in 1999 with the primary aim of providing cost-effective education leading to internationally recognized British degrees in Business Management and Information Technology. Students also have the opportunity to achieve their educational goals of Bachelor within two years. 

LSC hosts students from 130 nationalities, studying at the London Campus. The LSC Group of Colleges operates worldwide, with campuses in Malta, Colombo, Kuala Lumpur and Dhaka.

The LSC is accredited by the British Accreditation Council for Independent Further and Higher Education, Association of Independent Higher Education Providers (AIHEP) and the DFE. LSC is also a member of Education UK – British Council, registered with the Department for Innovation, Universities and Skills (DIUS) on its Register of Education and Training Providers.

History 
The London School of Commerce (LSC) was founded in November 1999, with an initial group of 55 students. They studied postgraduate and undergraduate programmes in Business and Computing in collaboration with Charles Sturt University, Australia.

In 2007, with the widening portfolio of collaborations, another sub-division, the School of Business and Law (SBL) was formed, which conducts more specialised programs in Accounting and Business. The School of Business and Law is an Associate College of the University of Gloucestershire. Simultaneously the Group started expanding overseas, and opened two campuses; Westminster International College (WIC) in Kuala Lumpur and Asian Centre for Management and Information Technology (ACMIT) in Bangladesh.

Three new colleges were added in 2010–2011. A new division in Sri Lanka was validated on 1 December 2010, and officially opened on 1 February 2011 as the British School of Commerce. Another campus in Belgrade, Serbia was validated on 8 December 2010, and officially opened on 8 February 2011.

The LSC Group has formed a Charity Foundation known as COPTE (Combating Poverty Through Education). The Charity is registered in order to sponsor educational projects, primarily in developing countries. The COPTE's mission is to assist destitute children in their educational path, through direct and philanthropic grant giving in order that the poverty cycle may be broken. One of the projects to receive support from COPTE in 2009 was Maw Sevana Home for Boys, Colombo, Sri Lanka.

Programmes 
LSC programmes of study:
 Bachelor of Arts (Honours) Business and Management Studies
 Master of Business Administration
 Master of Science Management Consultancy
 Doctor of Philosophy (PhD) in Business and Management Sciences

Campuses

United Kingdom 

 LSC London

London School of Commerce group of colleges consists of local and overseas campuses. The main LSC campus is located in the vicinity of London Bridge. A subsidiary campus was located for a while in Hannibal House, in the Elephant and Castle district of London, while another can be found at nearby Pocock House on Southwark Bridge Road. Additional classroom facilities are located close to London Bridge Station in Melior Street and Fenning Street. LSC London offers BA, MSc and MBA programmes in Business Management, Finance, Marketing and IT.

Overseas campuses 
 LSC Floriana, Malta
 BSC Colombo, Sri Lanka
 WIC Kuala Lumpur, Malaysia
 LSC Dhaka, Bangladesh

Floriana, Malta 

London School of Commerce Malta is located in Floriana, Malta. The school offers the opportunity for students to study English and obtain an internationally recognized MBA degree awarded by the University of Bedfordshire.

Colombo, Sri Lanka 
The British School of Commerce in Colombo was validated on 1 December 2010. The opening ceremony was held at the campus on 1 February 2011 with traditional Kandyan dancers and a candlelighting ceremony according to traditional Sri Lankan customs. The courses at the campus include Business Administration, Information Technology, International Hospitality Management and International Tourism Management. BSC in Colombo is a regional centre for students from Sri Lanka, India, Bangladesh, Nepal and the Maldives.

Kuala Lumpur, Malaysia 
Westminster International College is located in Subang Jaya, Selangor, the premier educational hub in Malaysia. The college is fully recognised as an institution of higher learning by Ministry of Higher Education Malaysia (MOHE) and the National Accreditation Board in Malaysia (MQA).

Dhaka, Bangladesh 
The LSC campus in Bangladesh started operating in 2007 and is located in the Banani district of Dhaka, close to the diplomatic enclave and business centres. The most recent campus building in the Gulshan Thana was opened in 2010 to accommodate Degree Foundation students.

See also 
List of schools in England

References

External links

 Website of organisation
 About LSC
 Association of Independent Higher Education Providers
 LSC on Infostud

Education in London